Tanska may refer to:

Tanska is a Finnish word for Denmark
Tanska, Estonia, village in Ridala Parish, Lääne County, Estonia
Jani Tanska (born 1988), Finnish football player